The Gelbe Burg ("Yellow Castle"), also called the Gelbe Bürg, is the site of a hill castle on the Gelber Berg ("Yellow Mountain") northeast of the market village of Heidenheim in the Middle Franconian county of Weißenburg-Gunzenhausen in the German state of Bavaria.

During the Migration Period there was a hilltop settlement on the Gelber Berg.
Hardly anything is known of the founding of the medieval castle and the course of its history.
Around 1180 the castle was owned by the bishops of Eichstätt: in a document the Eichstätt ministerialis, Chono de Woluesprunnen, was appointed to a district office (Amt) there.

On the eastern side of the mountain there are still clear traces of a long abandoned early medieval fortification of the circular rampart type. A neck ditch and collapsed wall remains are still visible on the castle site. In 1448 this ruin is mentioned in the stock book (Lagerbuch) at Heidenheim Abbey.

Literature 
 Konrad Spindler (revisor): Führer zu archäologischen Denkmälern in Deutschland, Band 14: Landkreis Weißenburg-Gunzenhausen - Archäologie und Geschichte. Konrad Theiss Verlag, Stuttgart, 1987, pp. 168–175.

External links 
 The Gelbe Bürg in the Franconian period
 The circular rampart of "Gelbe Bürg"

Hill castles
Migration Period
Castles in Bavaria
Heritage sites in Bavaria
Weißenburg-Gunzenhausen